Załuże may refer to the following places:
Załuże, Lesser Poland Voivodeship (south Poland)
Załuże, Łódź Voivodeship (central Poland)
Załuże, Subcarpathian Voivodeship (south-east Poland)